Camillia Berra (born 2 December 1994) is a Swiss freestyle skier. She was born in Champéry. She competed at the 2014 Winter Olympics in Sochi, in slopestyle, where she qualified for the finals.

References

External links

1994 births
Living people
Freestyle skiers at the 2014 Winter Olympics
Swiss female freestyle skiers
Olympic freestyle skiers of Switzerland
21st-century Swiss women